Gudmund Fredriksen (11 September 1899 – 26 March 1976) was a Norwegian footballer. He played in three matches for the Norway national football team from 1924 to 1927.

References

External links
 

1899 births
1976 deaths
Norwegian footballers
Norway international footballers
People from Horten
Association football forwards
FK Ørn-Horten players